Lost Child is a 2019 American thriller drama film directed by Ramaa Mosley, starring Leven Rambin, Jim Parrack, Taylor John Smith, Landon Edwards and Toni Chritton Johnson.

Cast
 Leven Rambin as Fern Sreaves
 Jim Parrack as Mike Rivers
 Taylor John Smith as Billy Sreaves
 Landon Edwards as Cecil
 Toni Chritton Johnson as Florine

Release
The film was released on 14 September 2018.

Reception
Kevin Crust of the Los Angeles Times wrote that the film "walks a fine line, balancing elements of psychological drama and the supernatural, with a surging undercurrent of social commentary that sneaks up on you."

Frank Schenk of The Hollywood Reporter wrote that the film "never becomes as affecting or suspenseful as it should be."

Matthew Row of Film Threat gave the film a score of 3/10 and wrote that while the film "does try to strike at a deeper emotional core through its mishmash of tropes, the over-glossed methodology and cheap resonance make the experience ultimately (and thoroughly) underwhelming."

References

External links
 
 

American thriller drama films
2018 thriller drama films